The women's 800 metres event at the 2013 Summer Universiade was held on 7–9 July.

Medalists

Results

Heats
Qualification: First 3 in each heat (Q) and the next 4 fastest (q) qualified for the semifinals.

Semifinals
Qualification: First 3 in each heat (Q) and the next 4 fastest (q) qualified for the semifinals.

Final

References 

800
2013 in women's athletics
2013